The 2003–04 Maryland Terrapins men's basketball team represented the University of Maryland in the 2003–2004 college basketball season as a member of the Atlantic Coast Conference (ACC). The team was led by head coach Gary Williams and played their home games at the Comcast Center. They won the 2004 ACC Men's Basketball Tournament—the first Maryland team to do so since 1984—and advanced to the round of 32 in the 2004 NCAA basketball tournament.

Roster

Schedule 

|-
!colspan=6|Regular Season

|-
!colspan=6|ACC Tournament

|-
!colspan=6|NCAA Tournament

References

Maryland Terrapins men's basketball seasons
Maryland
Maryland
Maryland
Maryland